was a Japanese football player. He played for Japan national team.

Club career
Takada was born in Shizuoka on June 28, 1951. After dropped out of Nihon University, he joined Mitsubishi Motors in 1971. The club won 1971 Emperor's Cup, 1973 Japan Soccer League and 1973 Emperor's Cup. In 1978, the club won all three major titles in Japan: Japan Soccer League, JSL Cup and Emperor's Cup. He retired in 1979. He played 128 games and scored 25 goals in the league. He was selected Best Eleven in 1972 and 1973.

National team career
In December 1970, when Takada was a Nihon University student, he was selected Japan national team for 1970 Asian Games. At this competition, on December 12, he debuted against Khmer. He also played at 1974 World Cup qualification. He played 16 games for Japan until 1975.

On October 1, 2009, Takada died of pancreatic cancer in Suginami, Tokyo at the age of 58.

Club statistics

National team statistics

References

External links
 
 Japan National Football Team Database

1951 births
2009 deaths
Nihon University alumni
Association football people from Shizuoka Prefecture
Japanese footballers
Japan international footballers
Japan Soccer League players
Urawa Red Diamonds players
Footballers at the 1970 Asian Games
Association football forwards
Asian Games competitors for Japan